The Ninth Chief Directorate (also nicknamed Devyatka of the KGB was the organization responsible for providing bodyguard services to the principal Communist Party of the Soviet Union (CPSU) leaders (and their families) and major Soviet government facilities (including nuclear-weapons stocks).  The directorate consisted of 40,000 uniformed troops. It operated the Moscow VIP subway system, and the secure government telephone system linking high-level government and CPSU officers.

In mid-1992 the KGB's Ninth Directorate became the Main Guard Directorate (Glavnoye upravleniye okhraneniya, GUO) and in 1996 it was re-organized to the Federal Protective Service of Russia.

References

KGB
Protective security units